The 2017 FA Cup Final was the 26th final of the Kazakhstan Cup since the countries independence. The match was contested between FC Kairat and FC Atyrau.

Match

Details

References

Kazakhstan Cup Finals
2017 in Kazakhstani football
2017 domestic association football cups